Huehuetán is a town and one of the 119 Municipalities of Chiapas, in southern Mexico. It covers an area of 313 km².

As of 2010, the municipality had a total population of 33,444, up from 31,464 as of 2005.

As of 2010, the town of Huehuetán had a population of 7,755. Other than the town of Huehuetán, the municipality had 114 localities, the largest of which (with 2010 populations in parentheses) were: Ignacio Zaragoza (2,464), and Texcaltic (1,743), classified as rural., Huehuetán Estación FFCC (6,314), classified as urban, and Guadalupe (1,687), Plan de Ayala (1,443), and Chamulapita (1,337), classified as rural.

References

Municipalities of Chiapas